= Magic Eye 01 =

Unmanned aerial vehicle

Magic Eye 01 is a medium-range unmanned aerial vehicle (UAV), manufactured according to NATO standards, used for remote as well as day-and-night observation.

== Specifications ==
The Magic Eye 01 weighs in at 40 kg, has and operational radio range of 100 to 200 km, top speed is 200 km/h and a flying time of 6 hours.

== Co-operational agreement ==
In Hanoi on November 20, 2012, the Vietnam Aerospace Association (VASA) and Unmanned Group from Sweden signed an agreement on the cooperation in manufacturing unmanned aircraft (UAV), called the Magic eye 01. The agreement is worked out in 3 phases, if all goes to plan Vietnam will become the latest of countries (around 40) to use UAV's.

Under phase 1 of the agreement, the Unmanned Group will transfer their entire manufacturing technologies for the Magic eye 01 (including the intellectual property rights) to Vietnam with the aim that Vietnam will be able to build two working Magic Eye 01's and in the future be the manufacturer and exporter for this aircraft.
